Kensington Square is a garden square in Kensington, London, W8. It was built from 1692 on land acquired for the purpose in 1685 and is the oldest such square in Kensington. The houses facing, Nos. 1–45, are listed Grade II for their architectural/historic merit.

History
In 1685, Thomas Young, a woodcarver, acquired land in Kensington which he sought to develop, and as he later described it in 1701, "did sett out and appoint a considerable part thereof to be built into a large Square of large and substantial Houses fit for the Habitacion of persons of good Worth and Quality, with Courts and Yards before and Gardens lying backwards".

In London, St. James's Square, Soho Square and Golden Square are a few years older, but in contrast with these Kensington Square still retains its residential character.

Garden
The garden is private and not open to the public, though it has taken part in the annual Open Garden Squares Weekend.

Heythrop College
No. 23 was Heythrop College, University of London until 2018, "the Specialist Philosophy and Theology College of the University of London," which included a library originally established in 1614 in Louvain (Leuven) by the Society of Jesus (the Jesuits) for those studies.

Former residents
Blue plaque holders
The square includes the former homes of:
composer Hubert Parry at No. 17
liberal philosopher John Stuart Mill at No. 18
sanitary reformer and pathologist John Simon at No. 40; 
Pre-Raphaelite artist Edward Burne-Jones at No. 41 —

Other homes belonged to, or were rented as their family home by:

Lawyer and positivist Vernon Lushington at No. 36. He introduced one of the foremost Pre-Raphaelites to another: E. Burne Jones (Burne-Jones) to Dante Gabriel Rossetti, at the Working Men's College. The Lushingtons and Parrys frequently visited each other.
Scholar and philanthropist Richard Buckley Litchfield (1832–1903) at No. 31 with his wife 
Henrietta Litchfield (1843–1927), who was Charles Darwin's daughter. 
Their niece, artist Gwen Raverat, describes visits there in her memoir Period Piece.

Between 1831 and 1896 (the) Kensington School occupied two sites:  No. 31, then  No.s 25–29. It is notable as one of the founders of the Football Association in 1863. The school built classrooms and fives courts in the gardens of the houses; all that remains is  No. 27a, the cottage or small house behind No. 28.

In popular culture
In the 2016 film The Exception, protagonist Mieke de Jong coyly inscribes a copy of landmark philosophical work Beyond Good and Evil with:

See also
 Squares in London
 List of city squares

References

External links
Kensington Square at OGSW

1698 establishments in England
Garden squares in London
Grade II listed houses in the Royal Borough of Kensington and Chelsea
Kensington
Squares in the Royal Borough of Kensington and Chelsea
Communal gardens